Eutrombicula splendens is a species of chigger. In Florida, it has been found on the marsh rice rat (Oryzomys palustris) and hispid cotton rat (Sigmodon hispidus).

See also
List of parasites of the marsh rice rat

References

Literature cited
Worth, C.B. 1950. Observations on ectoparasites of some small mammals in Everglades National Park and Hillsborough County, Florida (subscription required). The Journal of Parasitology 36(4):326–335.

Trombiculidae
Parasites of rodents
Endemic fauna of Florida